Marion Lignana Rosenberg (/ma.ʁjɔ̃ liˈɲaːna roːsən.ˈbærg/; December 8, 1961 – November 28, 2013) was a writer, music critic, translator and a broadcaster and journalist who blogged for WQXR Operavore and had a weekly column called Prima Fila for La Voce di New York. She contributed features, reviews, and essays about the arts to NewMusicBox, Town & Country, Newsday, Time Out New York, The Wall Street Journal, Capital New York, The Classical Review, Salon.com, Forward, The New York Times, San Francisco Chronicle, Boston, Opera News, and Playbill. Rosenberg's essay "Re-visioning Callas" won a Newswomen's Club of New York Front Page Award. She also wrote an entry on Maria Callas for Notable American Women: Completing the Twentieth Century (Harvard University Press).

Early life
Rosenberg was born in New Jersey to an Italian family from Piedmont, Italy. She was elected to Phi Beta Kappa and graduated from Harvard University with highest honors in Romance Languages and Literature. She studied theatre and opera history at the University of Florence and comparative literature at the University of California, Berkeley.

Career
Rosenberg was a certified translator of both Italian and French and she doted on vintage and contemporary European pop (including Luigi Tenco, Serge Gainsbourg, Françoise Hardy, Jacques Brel, Georges Brassens, Jacques Dutronc, Lucio Battisti, Gianmaria Testa, Ivano Fossati, and Carla Bruni). Among the moderns, her great musical love was Rufus Wainwright.

She spoke English, Italian and French fluently and she was eager to learn Spanish and Portuguese.

Death
Rosenberg died suddenly on the night of November 28, 2013, of a pulmonary embolism following Thanksgiving dinner at a friend's house in Endwell, New York. News of her death came out on December 2, 2013, six days before her 52nd birthday, and the day of Maria Callas' 90th birthday celebration, who was her idol and the main subject of her studies.

Works of Marion Lignana Rosenberg
The essay "Re-visioning Callas", published in (the now-defunct) USItalia, won a Front Page Award from the Newswomen's Club of New York, and represents the germ of her most acclaimed project.

The judges' citation read in part: "Maria Callas died in 1977 at age 53, but her tempestuous legend lives on. This essay is written with the same extraordinary passion and fire that characterized the opera diva's career. Offered up on the occasion of Callas's 90th birthday, this article acknowledges but righteously dismisses the 'petty, salacious lore' of the woman's private life and celebrates the performer's extreme dedication to her art [and] her lasting gifts to music. Whether you agree or disagree, it's a compelling, absorbing read from start to finish. Bravo!"

References

External links
 Marion Lignana Rosenberg Articles – WQRX
 Mondo Marion – Marion Lignana Rosenberg's official page
 Re-visioning Callas – Marion Lignana Rosenberg's essay blog
 Il Brucomela – Cultura a New York
 Ci ha lasciato Marion Lignana Rosenberg: Musicologa e scrittrice con il culto del bello

American writers of Italian descent
Writers from New Jersey
Opera critics
American women journalists
American bloggers
American LGBT rights activists
1961 births
2013 deaths
Harvard University alumni
American women bloggers
Women writers about music
University of California, Berkeley alumni
University of Florence alumni
21st-century American non-fiction writers
21st-century American women writers